Green Challenge may refer to
Green Comm Challenge
Michelin Green X Challenge, a part of the American Le Mans Series
SK Golf Challenge, which was to be known as Green Challenge prior to its cancellation in 2010
World Green Challenge